Gambir Train Station (station code: GMR) is a major railway station in Gambir, Gambir, Central Jakarta, Jakarta, Indonesia. The station is located on the eastern side of Merdeka Square and on the western side of the Gerakan Pramuka Indonesia headquarters and Immanuel Church.

During the Dutch East Indies era, the name of this station was Weltevreden Station, which later changed its name to Batavia Koningsplein Station after repairs were made in the 1930s. In the 1950s, the name of this station again changed to Gambir Station and then major repairs were carried out to become an elevated railway station from 1988 to 1992.

Currently Gambir Station serves as a terminus for most intercity trains operating across Java Island. One of Jakarta's main commuter lines, the KRL Commuterline Bogor Line (to Bogor) pass through this station, but do not stop here since 2012. There are however, plans to reactivate the station as a stop for commuter, due to high volume of passenger that board and exiting from Gambir's neighboring-commuter only stations ( and  station). Originally, only executive and business class trains use Gambir Station, while all economy class trains and some executive and business class trains use Pasar Senen railway station instead. Since ca. 2016, the norm has changed when KAI introduced new types of economy class coaches in higher class trains e.g. Argo Parahyangan, in line with plans to gradually abolish business class trains.

History

Ground-level station (1884-1992) 

This station is located on the first section of the Batavia–Buitenzorg railway line which was inaugurated by the Nederlandsch-Indische Spoorweg Maatschappij (NIS), namely the Batavia–Weltevreden section. At its opening, the line stretched from near the old Sunda Kelapa port and south to what is now Gambir area. At first, Gambir station was thought to be a small railway stop (halte Koningsplein) which was inaugurated on September 16, 1871, simultaneously with the opening of the first section of the line. This stop was very small and simple. The station was situated on the southeast border of the Koningsplein. This stop was the southernmost stop of Batavia until 1873, when the line was extended to Meester Cornelis and Buitenzorg.

This stop was later replaced by the more permanent and larger Weltevreden Station, opened on 4 October 1884 where Gambir Station is now located. Until 1906, this station was the departure station for Bandung and Surabaya destinations. The station building had a roof supported on cast iron bearings according to the Staatsspoorwegen (SS) design, according to a statement in 1881. The station was designed in neoclassical style which was popular in the 19th-century. Until then the NIS had not placed roofs of this type, while the SS had placed them in several places.

In 1928 this station was renovated in Art Deco style. In 1937 the name Weltevreden station was changed to Batavia Koningsplein Station and after Indonesian independence the name was changed to Jakarta Gambir Station.

This station did not change form after Indonesian independence until 1971 because it was significantly extended at the same year.

Elevated station and future developments (1992-present day) 

In February 1988, at the same time as the construction of the Jakarta Kota–Manggarai elevated railway, the old station with an Art Deco style from the Dutch East Indies era was demolished and replaced with a new building which still exists today. On June 5, 1992, President Soeharto along with first lady Siti Hartinah and government officials inaugurated the new Gambir Station by boarding the KRL from Gambir Station to Jakarta Kota Station. There were 4 lines at Gambir Station when it became an elevated line, and the station building is completely modern with a joglo architectural style with a lime-green ceramic facade. The paint color has not changed, only the platform poles have been re-colored into moss green. This project has spent Rp. 432.5 billion rupiah and was not fully completed when it was inaugurated, so that it was able to fully operate a year later. After the construction of the elevated station was completed, the railroad track below began to be removed and the area which was originally an emplacement for the old Gambir Station had turned into a car park starting in 1994.

Based on the master plan made by the Ministry of Transportation of the Republic of Indonesia, this station is planned to serve KRL Commuterline only. The master plan reappeared when the Manggarai Station was planned to be used as the final stop for non-KRL passenger trains, which aims to reduce the density of passenger train queues on the elevated railway which sometimes disrupt KRL Commuterline trips. As a result of this plan, the Ministry of Transportation decided to separate the non-KRL and KRL Commuterline lines after the construction of the station was completed. With the completion of the construction of the Manggarai station as a central station, all long/medium-distance passenger trains that terminates at Gambir Station will be moved to Manggarai Station in 2025.

Starting in February 2022, the old electric signaling system produced by Siemens type SSI along the flyover has been replaced with the newest one produced by PT Len Industri.

Building layout and facilities

Gambir Station has four railway lines, with lines 2 and 3 being straight tracks.

After Eid al-Fitr Lebaran in 2012, this station was no longer used as a stopping station for KRL Commuterline, and KRL passengers were diverted to the nearby stations, namely Gondangdia and Juanda Station.

This station consists of three floors. The main hall, counters, restaurants, shops and ATM machines are on the first floor. The second floor is the waiting area with several fast food restaurants and cafeterias, while the platforms and rail tracks are on the third floor. Because this station is a major station, announcements are made in two languages, namely Indonesian and English.

When Ignasius Jonan served as the President Director of PT Kereta Api Indonesia, it was planned to build a restaurant using original train units in the parking area of ​​Gambir Station. The prospective rail has also been installed, and it is planned to use the 1978 class of the former Rheostatic KRL unit from Purwakarta Station as the restaurant. The prospective Rheostatic KRL unit that was to be used was separated from piles of other lapsed commuter trains and stored in the Purwakarta locomotive depot, because it was planned to be brought to Gambir Station. However, this restaurant plan was never realized, only the rails were installed. The prospective Rheostatic KRL unit that had been stored in the Purwakarta locomotive depot was also never brought here, and ended up being scrapped like other rejected Rheostatic KRL units. The former rail track for this restaurant is still visible in 2018, until it was finally demolished at some point.

This station is now equipped with a Rail Transit Suite, which is a special transit hotel for train passengers who want to rest.

Services
The following is a list of train services at the Gambir Station

Intercity
 Argo Bromo Anggrek to 
 to 
 
 to 
 to 
Argo Parahyangan to 
 to 
 to 
Purwojaya to 
 to 
 to 
  to

KRL Commuterline
The Bogor Line passes through but skips the station since 2013, due to the station's busy intercity schedule. Commuter train passengers must use either  or  station and then other modes of transport to reach Gambir station. However, the station will be converted to a Commuterline-only station as intercity trains are planned to terminate at Manggarai station by 2025.

Supporting transportation

DAMRI bus
DAMRI buses from Gambir Station to Soekarno–Hatta International Airport run everyday from 01:00 until 21:00. The ticket price is Rp .

City transport
Many local modes of transport service Gambir Station, including: buses, minibuses, taxis, bajaj and TransJakarta. All transportation line noted is no more than 500 meter from the station.

TransJakarta
There are two main TransJakarta bus stations near Gambir Station, which are Gambir 1 and Gambir 2. Aside from that, there are a number of feeder stops near the station.

Gambir 1 serve routes:
 Corridor 2 towards Monas 
 Corridor 2C towards JI Expo*
 Corridor 2D towards Kalideres
 Corridor 6H towards Senen**
 Corridor 7F towards Juanda

Gambir 2 serve routes:
 Corridor 2 towards Pulogadung
 Corridor 2A towards Pulogadung
 Corridor 2C towards JI Expo*
 Corridor 2D towards ASMI
 Corridor 5C towards PGC 2
 Corridor 7F towards Kampung Rambutan
(*) Corridor 2C is operated only during events are being held at JI Expo.(**) Corridor 6H towards Senen is not served by Minitrans, as it has no left high floor BRT door.

Feeder routes near the station:
 Corridor 1P (Senen - Bundaran Senayan) both direction
 Corridor 1R (Senen - Tanah Abang) towards Tanah Abang
 Corridor 2P (Gondangdia - Senen) towards Senen
 Corridor 2Q (Gondangdia - Balaikota) 
 Corridor 5M (Kampung Melayu - Tanah Abang via Cikini) towards Tanah Abang
 Corridor 6H (Senen - Lebak Bulus) both direction

Regular Bus
AJA.P P106 (Senen - Cimone)
DSU P157 (Senen - Poris Plawad)
Mayasari Bakti P14 (Tanah Abang - Tanjung Priok)
MetroMini P15 (Senen - Setiabudi)
Kopaja P20 (Senen - Lebak Bulus)
Kopaja T502 (Tanah Abang - Kampung Melayu)

Gallery

See also

Rail transport in Indonesia

References

Works cited

External links

 PT KAI  - the Indonesian rail company

Central Jakarta
Railway stations in Jakarta
Railway stations opened in 1884